The Paulding County Courthouse is a historic governmental building in downtown Paulding, Ohio, United States.  A Richardsonian Romanesque building erected in 1886, it is the third courthouse to serve the residents of Paulding County.

When Paulding County was established in 1820, the small community of Charloe was named the county seat.  This arrangement proved to be short-lived: the community of Paulding grew significantly while Charloe stagnated, and the county seat was eventually moved to the larger village.  Once Paulding had been named the county seat, the county's second courthouse was erected on the village's central square in 1837.  After approximately fifty years of service, this frame structure was demolished, and the present structure was built on the same location in 1886.

Designed by the E.O. Fallis Company and built by workers under the direction of general contractor Rudolph Ehrhart, the courthouse is a brick structure with a stone foundation and a roof of asphalt. Two-and-one-half stories tall with a central tower, the courthouse features nearly identical entrances on each of its four sides.

In 1974, the Paulding County Courthouse was listed on the National Register of Historic Places, due to its well-preserved architecture that was deemed significant statewide.  It is one of four buildings in Paulding County on the Register, along with a rural round barn, a former train station in the village of Antwerp, and the Carnegie library in Paulding.

References

Government buildings completed in 1886
County courthouses in Ohio
Courthouses on the National Register of Historic Places in Ohio
Buildings and structures in Paulding County, Ohio
National Register of Historic Places in Paulding County, Ohio
Richardsonian Romanesque architecture in Ohio